The girls' slopestyle event at the 2016 Winter Youth  Olympics took place on 19 February at the Hafjell Freepark.

Results
The final was started at 10:10.

References

External links
olympedia.org
 

Snowboarding at the 2016 Winter Youth Olympics